Dieter Berkmann (born 27 July 1950) is a German former cyclist. He competed for West Germany at the 1972 Summer Olympics and 1976 Summer Olympics.

References

External links
 

1950 births
Living people
German male cyclists
Olympic cyclists of West Germany
Cyclists at the 1972 Summer Olympics
Cyclists at the 1976 Summer Olympics
Cyclists from Bavaria
People from Garmisch-Partenkirchen (district)
Sportspeople from Upper Bavaria